In discrete mathematics, a discrete fixed-point is a fixed-point for functions defined on finite sets, typically subsets of the integer grid .

Discrete fixed-point theorems were developed by Iimura, Murota and Tamura, Chen and Deng and others. Yang provides a survey.

Basic concepts 
Continuous fixed-point theorems often require a continuous function. Since continuity is not meaningful for functions on discrete sets, it is replaced by conditions such as a direction-preserving function. Such conditions imply that the function does not change too drastically when moving between neighboring points of the integer grid. There are various direction-preservation conditions, depending on whether neighboring points are considered points of a hypercube (HGDP), of a simplex (SGDP) etc. See the page on direction-preserving function for definitions.

Continuous fixed-point theorems often require a convex set. The analogue of this property for discrete sets is an integrally-convex set.

For functions on discrete sets 
We focus on functions  , where the domain X is a nonempty subset of the Euclidean space .  ch(X) denotes the convex hull of X.

Yang's theorems:

This is a discrete analogue of the Poincaré–Miranda theorem. It is a consequence of the previous theorem.
This is a discrete analogue of the Brouwer fixed-point theorem.
This is a discrete analogue of the Kakutani fixed-point theorem, and the function f is an analogue of a continuous selection function.
See the survey for more theorems.

For discontinuous functions on continuous sets 
Discrete fixed-point theorems are closely related to fixed-point theorems on discontinuous functions. These, too, use the direction-preservation condition instead of continuity.

Herings-Laan-Talman-Yang fixed-point theorem: 

Then f has a fixed point in X.

The theorem is originally stated for polytopes, but Philippe Bich extends it to convex compact sets, cf Theorem 3.7 in his paper "Some fixed point theorems for discontinuous mappings".

 
Note that every continuous function is LGDP, but an LGDP function may be discontinuous. An LGDP function may even be neither upper nor lower semi-continuous.  Moreover, there is a constructive algorithm for approximating this fixed point.

Applications 
Discrete fixed-point theorems have been used to prove the existence of a Nash equilibrium in a discrete game, and the existence of a Walrasian equilibrium in a discrete market.

References 

Discrete mathematics
Fixed-point theorems